Horace Eaton (June 22, 1804 – July 4, 1855) was an American Whig politician, a medical doctor, the 14th lieutenant governor of Vermont, and the 18th governor of Vermont.

Biography
Eaton was born in Barnard, Vermont, on June 22, 1804. He graduated from Middlebury College in 1825, taught at Middlebury Academy for two years, then moved to Enosburg, a village in Berkshire, Vermont, where his father practiced medicine. He studied with his father while attending medical school at Castleton State College; Eaton graduated in 1828, and then joined his father's practice. He was married twice; first to Cordelia H. Fuller with whom he had two children, and then to Edna Palmer.

Career
Eaton was town clerk of Enosburg. He was a member of the Vermont Senate in 1837 and from 1839 to 1842.

Eaton was elected the lieutenant governor of Vermont and served from 1843 to 1846.

Eaton served as the eighteenth governor of Vermont from 1846 to 1848. He was a delegate to the state Constitutional Convention in 1848. During his administration, he opposed the admission of slave states to the Union and to the Mexican War.

Eaton played a key role in the creation of the state Superintendent of Public Instruction position, and he was the first one to hold it, serving from 1845 to 1850. In 1848 he was appointed professor of chemistry and natural history at Middlebury, and held the chair until 1855.

Death
Eaton died in Middlebury, Vermont, on July 4, 1855, the 79th anniversary of American independence; and is interred at Enosburg Center Cemetery, Enosburg Center, Franklin County, Vermont.

References

External links
Horace Eaton at The Political Graveyard
Enosburgh Center Cemetery
Horace Eaton at National Governors Association

1804 births
1855 deaths
Governors of Vermont
Vermont Whigs
Middlebury College alumni
People from Windsor County, Vermont
People from Barnard, Vermont
People from Enosburgh, Vermont
Vermont state senators
Presidents pro tempore of the Vermont Senate
Lieutenant Governors of Vermont
Whig Party state governors of the United States
19th-century American politicians
Burials in Vermont